Armstrong Creek is an unincorporated community in the town of Armstrong Creek, Forest County, Wisconsin, United States. Armstrong Creek has a post office with ZIP code 54103.

References

Unincorporated communities in Forest County, Wisconsin
Unincorporated communities in Wisconsin